The 2010–11 season was PFC CSKA Sofia's 63rd consecutive season in A Group. This article shows player statistics and all matches (official and friendly) that the club will play during the 2010–11 season.

Players

Squad statistics 

Appearances for competitive matches only

|-
|colspan="14"|Players sold or loaned out after the start of the season:

|}

As of 29 May 2011

Players in/out

Summer transfers 

In:

Out:

Winter transfers 

In:

Out:

Player seasonal records 

Competitive matches only. Updated to games played 29 May 2011.

Goalscorers

Start formations

Overall

{|class="wikitable" style="text-align: center;"
|-
!
!Total
! Home
! Away
|-
|align=left| Games played || 30 || 15 || 15
|-
|align=left| Games won    || 18 || 10 || 8
|-
|align=left| Games drawn  || 7 || 3 || 4
|-
|align=left| Games lost   || 4 || 2 || 3
|-
|align=left| Biggest win  || 4–0 vs Chernomorets || 3–1 vs Lokomotiv Sofia3–1 vs Akademik Sofia || 4–0 vs Chernomorets
|-
|align=left| Biggest loss || 1–4 vs Lokomotiv Plovdiv || 1–2 vs Chernomorets || 1–4 vs Lokomotiv Plovdiv
|-
|align=left| Clean sheets    || 13 || 8 || 5
|-
|align=left| Goals scored    || 53 || 23 || 30
|-
|align=left| Goals conceded  || 26 || 10 || 16
|-
|align=left| Goal difference || +27 || +11 || +14
|-
|align=left| Top scorer      || Delev – 13 || Delev – 7 || Delev – 6
|-
|align=left| Winning rate    || % || % ||  % 
|-

Source: Soccerway

Pre-season and friendlies

Competitions

A Group

Table

Results summary

Results by round

Fixtures and results

Bulgarian Cup 

CSKA advanced to the third round.

CSKA advanced to the quarter-finals.

CSKA advanced to the semi-finals.

CSKA advanced to the final.

CSKA won the competition, thus gaining the right to enter the play-off round of the 2011–12 UEFA Europa League season.

Europa League

Third qualifying round 

CSKA advanced to the play-off round.

Play-off round 

CSKA advanced to the group stage.

Group Stage 

CSKA finished fourth in their group and were eliminated from the competition.

UEFA Club Rankings
This is the current UEFA Club Rankings, including season 2009–10.

See also 

PFC CSKA Sofia

References

External links 
CSKA Official Site
Bulgarian A Professional Football Group
UEFA Profile

PFC CSKA Sofia seasons
Cska Sofia